Hyssopus (hyssop) is a genus of herbaceous or semi-woody plants in the family Lamiaceae, native from the east Mediterranean to central Asia as far east as Mongolia. They are aromatic, with erect branched stems up to 60 cm long covered with fine hairs at the tips. The leaves are narrow oblong, 2–5 cm long. The small blue flowers are borne on the upper part of the branches during summer. By far the best-known species is the herb hyssop (H. officinalis), widely cultivated outside its native area in the Mediterranean.

Though commonly called "hyssop", anise hyssop (Agastache foeniculum; also called blue giant hyssop) and all Agastache species are not members of Hyssopus. However, both genera are in the mint family.  

Species
 Hyssopus ambiguus (Trautv.) Iljin ex Prochorov. & Lebel - Altai Republic of Russia, Kazakhstan
 Hyssopus cuspidatus Boriss. - Altai Republic, Kazakhstan, Xinjiang, Mongolia
 Hyssopus latilabiatus C.Y.Wu & H.W.Li - Xinjiang
 Hyssopus macranthus Boriss. - Altai Republic of Russia, Western Siberia, Kazakhstan
 Hyssopus officinalis L. - central + southern Europe, Algeria, Morocco, east to Iran
 Hyssopus seravschanicus (Dub.) Pazij - Afghanistan, Pakistan, Kyrgyzstan, Tajikistan
 Hyssopus subulifolius (Rech.f.) Rech.f. - Afghanistan.

History
The name hyssop can be traced back almost unchanged through the Greek ύσσωπος. The name hyssop appears in some translations of the Bible, but researchers have suggested that the Biblical accounts refer not to the plant currently known as hyssop but rather to a related herb. The Septuagint translates the name as ὕσσωπος hyssop, and English translations of the Bible often follow this rendering. The Hebrew word אזוב (esov or esob) and the Greek word ὕσσωπος probably share a common (unknown) origin. The biblical plant is discussed further at ezov.

End Uses
The herb hyssop is used both as a condiment and a medicine. Hyssop leaves and flowers are used to flavor salads and soups. It is also used in the preparation of liquor and perfumes. In addition, it is used as a pot herb.

This herb is used in the treatment of throat and lung complaints, and is regarded as a stimulant, carminative, and expectorant. It is also effective in treating nervous disorders and toothache. Additionally, it is useful for treating pulmonary, digestive, uterine, urinary and asthma problems. Its leaves are stimulant, stomachic, carminative, and soothing to colic, and its juice is used to treat roundworms.

In addition to its use as a flavoring agent in bitters and tonics, hyssop oil is also used in perfumery. Various types of bronchial catarrh and asthma can be treated with it in small quantities.

See also
Agastache, commonly known as giant hyssop
Za'atar
Ezov

References

Lamiaceae
Herbs
Taxa named by Carl Linnaeus
Lamiaceae genera